Pieter Boogaart is the European Secretary of the Folly Fellowship. A noted book reviewer and teacher, he lives with his wife and collaborator, Rita Boogaart, in the Netherlands.

Works

Boogaart is the author of the book A272 - An Ode to a Road (Pallas Athene, 2000), which covers the road itself as well as selected places within six or seven miles to the north and south. It was described by the John Sandoe Bookshop as "the most eccentric and fascinating guidebook we have ever seen!"

Although the text has remained relatively obscure to most, in many places it has gathered a cult following, to the extent that a TV series may be created. The text was also chosen for study in English A-Levels in 2006.

References
The Argus Article

Living people
Dutch non-fiction writers
Year of birth missing (living people)